Wrecked is a 1996 album released by Raymond Watts (as PIG). Wrecked was originally released in Japan in 1996, and was later released in the United States on 16 September 1997 by Wax Trax/TVT Records.  Each release is different, with different track run times, as well as different tracks present. A promotional video for 'Everything' exists, but remains unreleased outside Japan.

Track listing

Original (Japanese) release
 "Wrecked" – 7:19
 "The Book of Tequila" – 6:17
 "Everything" – 3:43
 "Find It, Fuck It, Forget It (Regret It Mix)" – 3:39
 "Save Me" – 4:51
 "The Only Good One's a Dead One" – 5:40
 "Fuck Me I'm Sick" – 6:52
 "My Sanctuary (Spent Sperm Mix)" – 6:39
 "Blades (Slash Mix)" – 6:37
 "Silt" – 6:33

US release
 "Wrecked" – 7:19
 "No One Gets Out of Her Alive" – 5:52
 "Everything" – 3:44
 "Contempt" – 4:32
 "Save Me" – 4:52
 "The Only Good One's a Dead One" – 5:40
 "Blades (Slash Mix)" – 6:11
 "Find It, Fuck It, Forget It (Sump Mix)" – 4:43
 "My Sanctuary (Spent Sperm Mix)" – 7:31
 "Silt" – 6:35

12" 2017 Tour Edition
 "Wrecked"
 "The Book of Tequila"
 "Everything (2017 Remaster)"
 "Find It, Fuck It, Forget It (Regret It Mix)"
 "Save Me"
 "The Only Good One's a Dead One"
 "Fuck Me I'm Sick"
 "My Sanctuary (Spent Sperm Mix)"
 "Blades (Slash Mix)"
 "Silt"
 "Strength Through Submission (Short)"
 "No One Gets Out Of Her Alive"
 "Contempt"
 "Find It, Fuck It, Forget It (Sump Mix)"
 "Fuck Me I'm Sick (As Fuck)"
 "Strength Through Submission (Long)"

All tracks written by Raymond Watts, except "Wrecked" written by Raymond Watts and Steve White, and "Everything" written by Raymond Watts and Santos de Castro.

Personnel
Raymond Watts – vocals, programming
Steve White – guitars, programming

Additional Personnel
Günter Schulz – guitars
Rob Henry – programming
Atsushi Sakurai – backing vocals on "No One Gets Out of Her Alive"
Hisashi Imai – guitars on "No One Gets Out of Her Alive"
Jennie Bellestar – backing vocals
Ruth McArdle – backing vocals
Lian Warmington – backing vocals
Julian Beeston – programming
James Reynolds – additional engineering
Ben Drakeford – additional engineering
Giles Littlefield – additional programming

References

Pig (musical project) albums
1996 albums